The Capital Markets Authority of Kenya, also known as CMA, is a government financial regulatory entity responsible for supervising, licensing and monitoring the activities of the capital markets within the  Republic of Kenya, market intermediaries, including the stock exchange, and the central depository and settlement system and all other persons licensed under the Capital Markets Act of Kenya.

The Capital Markets Authority regulates the capital markets sector by providing guidelines for corporate asset allocation. In the Capital Markets Act, guidelines for the amount of funds to be invested in each class of assets e.g. equities, government bonds and bills, are given in ranges.

Establishment
The Capital Markets Authority is a body corporate with perpetual succession and a common seal and capable, in its corporate name, of:
 Suing and being sued;
 Taking, purchasing or otherwise acquiring, holding, charging and disposing of both movable and immovable property;
 Borrowing and lending money;
 Entering into contracts; and
 Doing or performing all such other things or acts necessary for the proper performance of its functions under the Capital Markets Act which may lawfully be done by a body corporate.

Objectives
The main objectives of the CMA are stated to be:-
 the development of all aspects of capital markets with particular emphasis on the removal of impediments to, and the creation of incentives for longer-term investments in productive enterprises;
 to facilitate the existence of a nationwide system of stock market and brokerage services so as to enable wider participation of the general public in the stock market;
 the creation, maintenance and regulation of a market in which securities can be issued and traded in an orderly, fair and efficient manner, through the implementation of a system in which the market participants are self-regulatory to the maximum practicable extent;
 the protection of investor interests;
 the operation of a compensation fund to protect investors from financial loss arising from the failure of a licensed broker or dealer * to meet his contractual obligations; and
 the development of a framework to facilitate the use of electronic commerce for the development of capital markets in Kenya.

Composition
The Authority consists of -
 a chairman to be appointed by the President on the recommendation of the Minister;
 six other members appointed by the Minister;
 the Permanent Secretary to the Treasury or a person deputed by him in writing for the purposes of this Act;
 the Governor of the Central Bank of Kenya or a person deputed by him in writing for the purposes of this Act;
 the Attorney-General or a person deputed by him in writing for the purposes of this Act:
 the Chief Executive Officer of the Authority.

Management
The current members of the Board of Directors are:
Mr. Nicholas A. Nesbitt (EBS), (OGW) - Chairman 
Mr. Wyckliffe M. Shamiah - Chief Executive Officer
Hon. (Amb.) Ukur Yatani (EGH) - Cabinet Secretary, The National Treasury and Planning
Mr. Musa Kathanje - Alternate to the Cabinet Secretary, The National Treasury and Planning
Paul Kihara Kariuki - Attorney General
Ms. Christine Kanini - Alternate to the Attorney General
Dr. Patrick Ngugi Njoroge - Governor, Central Bank of Kenya
Mr. David Luusa - Alternate to the Governor, Central Bank of Kenya
Mr. John K. Birech
Mr. Eli Mwangi
Ms. Hellen Ombati - Company Secretary

See also 
 Nairobi Stock Exchange
 Micah Cheserem, a former Chairman

References

External links
 Capital Markets Authority

Government agencies of Kenya
Organisations based in Nairobi
Financial regulatory authorities